The Human Highlight Reel is a compilation album by the American rock band Man Overboard, released on Run for Cover Records on 10 May 2011.

Track listing
 Driveway
 Melanie, Video Games And A Slight Fear Of Flying
 I Saw Behemoth and It Ruled (Electric) (originally on The Absolute Worst)
 They Don't Make 'm Like They Use To (originally on Dahlia)
 Five Girls Pizza (originally on Dahlia)
 I Ate My Gluestick
 Love Your Friends Die Laughing (Electric)
 Again (originally a Bandcamp bonus track for Real Talk)
 Red Paint (Promise Ring cover version)
 Crybaby (originally on Noise From Upstairs)
 210B (originally on Noise From Upstairs)
 Dylan’s Song (originally on Noise From Upstairs)
 I Saw Behemoth and It Ruled (originally on Noise From Upstairs)
 Dear You (originally on Noise From Upstairs)
 Different People (originally on Vs. The Earthquake Compilation)
 Decemberism (originally on the first No Sleep Records Christmas Compilation)

References

External links

The Human Highlight Reel at YouTube (streamed copy where licensed)

Man Overboard (band) compilation albums
2011 albums
Run for Cover Records albums